The Sir Hugh Casson Award for the worst new building of the year has been awarded annually since 1982 by the 'Nooks and Corners' column of the British satirical magazine Private Eye. The name ironically honours Sir Hugh Casson. Column author Gavin Stamp explained in 2015 that "he would turn up – take a fee – for giving evidence at public inquiries to recommend the demolition of buildings: a trade I despise". Stamp noted that Casson would sometimes mention his office as Vice-Chairman of The Victorian Society when arguing for the demolition of Victorian buildings. The medal of the award uses a sketch of Casson which is a self-portrait.

Winners

Notes

References

Casson
Casson
Casson